is a Japanese manga series written by Kōta Amana and illustrated by Yōko Umezu about a young magician who accidentally makes a contract with a legendary and powerful female demon, eventually becoming her master and lover and the trials and challenges they face so that they can live in peace together. It has been serialized in Square Enix's shōnen manga magazine Monthly Shōnen Gangan since August 2018, with its chapters collected into six tankōbon volumes as of June 2022. An anime television series adaptation by Staple Entertainment aired from July to September 2022.

Characters

First year at the Ortigia Academy of Magic, he is a A-grade student except in summoning class. At risk of repeating a year unless he performs a successful summoning, he discovers a grimoire in the school library. Performing the spell within, he succeeds in summoning a naked demon girl named Vermeil. His blood possesses a high degree of mana, making most summoned spirits avoid him despite his calls. Vermeil on the other hand likes "potent" mana, hence why she answered. Despite her high degree of power, she agrees to become Alto's familiar.

A female demon, who appears to be a succubus-type and a very powerful one. She is able to knock out a rampaging dragon with a finger flick. Vermeil seems to be sealed in some kind of grimoire, before Alto breaks her out. She needs to kiss Alto to drain his mana to live, she can also amplify the mana and transfer them to her contractor. She loves to tease him.

Alto's childhood friend, who is in love with him and becomes jealous when Vermeil appears and other girls surrounds Alto. She made a contract with a high-class wind spirit, named Sylphid.

Media

Manga
Written by Kōta Amana and illustrated by Yōko Umezu, Vermeil in Gold began serialization in Square Enix's shōnen manga magazine Monthly Shōnen Gangan on August 10, 2018. The first tankōbon volume was released on April 12, 2019. As of June 2022, six volumes have been released.

Volume list

Anime
An anime television series adaptation was announced on March 10, 2022. The series is produced by Staple Entertainment and directed by Takashi Naoya, with scripts written by Tatsuya Takahashi, character designs handled by Kiyoshi Tateishi, and music composed by Ken Itō and Kenichi Kuroda. It aired from July 5 to September 20, 2022, on AT-X, Tokyo MX, BS11, and SUN. The opening theme song is "Abracada-Boo" by Kaori Ishihara, while the ending theme song is "Mortal With You" by Mili. Sentai Filmworks has licensed the series under the title Vermeil in Gold: A Desperate Magician Barges Into the Magical World Alongside the Strongest Calamity. At their Otakon panel in July 2022, Sentai Filmworks announced that the series will receive an English dub, which premiered on September 27, 2022.

Episode list

Notes

References

External links
  
  
 

Anime series based on manga
Fantasy anime and manga
Gangan Comics manga
Romantic comedy anime and manga
Sentai Filmworks
Shōnen manga